Birding is the bimonthly magazine of the American Birding Association. Birding publishes articles on field identification, bird conservation, notable sightings, and other subjects of interest to the birding community. Each issue also includes critical reviews of new equipment and books.

A six-part history of birding in North America as reported in the pages of Birding appeared in 2006. 

 The History of Birding Part I. 1968–1974
 The History of Birding Part II. 1975–1980
 The History of Birding Part III. 1981–1987
 The History of Birding Part IV. 1988–1993
 The History of Birding Part V. 1994–2000
 The History of Birding Part VI. 2001–2006

See also
List of journals and magazines relating to birding and ornithology

References

External links
Official website

Bimonthly magazines published in the United States
Journals and magazines relating to birding and ornithology
Magazines established in 1969
Wildlife magazines
American Birding Association